The European Tour 2013/2014 – Event 6 (also known as the 2013 Kay Suzanne Memorial Cup) was a professional minor-ranking snooker tournament that took place between 7–10 November 2013 at The Capital Venue in Gloucester, England.

John Higgins was the defending champion, but he lost 0–4 against Andrew Higginson in the last 128.

Mark Allen won his sixth professional title by defeating Judd Trump 4–1 in the final. Allen became the first player to win two consecutive Players Tour Championship events in the same season.

Prize fund and ranking points
The breakdown of prize money and ranking points of the event is shown below:

1 Only professional players can earn ranking points.

Main draw

Preliminary rounds

Round 1
Best of 7 frames

Round 2
Best of 7 frames

Round 3
Best of 7 frames

Main rounds

Top half

Section 1

Section 2

Section 3

Section 4

Bottom half

Section 5

Section 6

Section 7

Section 8

Finals

Century breaks

 140  Ken Doherty
 137, 136, 116, 102  Mark Allen
 136, 108  Marco Fu
 135, 110, 110, 108, 105  Neil Robertson
 134  Ryan Day
 133, 123  Peter Ebdon
 132  Pankaj Advani
 132  Dominic Dale
 132  Ali Carter
 128, 110, 110, 107, 107  Judd Trump
 128  Alan McManus
 126, 105  Stuart Bingham
 126  Kurt Maflin
 125  Jamie Burnett
 124, 123, 102  Mark Selby

 124  Graeme Dott
 123  Jamie O'Neil
 122  Mark Davis
 117  David Morris
 114  Gary Wilson
 110  Stephen Maguire
 110  Thepchaiya Un-Nooh
 107, 100  Joel Walker
 107  Luca Brecel
 105, 105  Ronnie O'Sullivan
 105, 103  Dave Harold
 101  James Wattana
 101  Fergal O'Brien
 101  Sam Baird
 100  Chris Wakelin

References

2013
ET6
2013 in English sport
November 2013 sports events in the United Kingdom